Holosiivska is the second station on the Kyiv Metro's Obolonsko–Teremkivska Line's Holosiiv-Teremky extension.  It opened on 15 December 2010. The station is situated in the Holosiiv Raion near the Holosiivska Square.

The station was due to open late 2008, and that opening was later rescheduled by Metro authorities to March 2009. It was again postponed to Independence Day August 2009. A trial run of a train took place on 5 November. Finally the extension opened on 15 December 2010.

References

Kyiv Metro stations
Railway stations opened in 2010
2010 establishments in Ukraine
Holosiivskyi District